Following is a list of Alpha Chi Omega chapters. Active chapters are indicated in bold. Inactive chapters are indicated in italic.

Notes

References 

Lists of chapters of United States student societies by society